Al-Mansur Muhammad bin Abdallah (December 16, 1802 – February 8, 1890) was an imam of the Zaydiyya sect in Yemen who claimed the imam title in the period 1853–1890, and ruled briefly in the capital San'a in 1853.

Muhammad bin Abdallah al-Wazir was a Sayyid of the Al Wazir lineage from Wadi'l-Sirr. He was a 23rd-generation descendant of the imam ad-Da'i Yusuf (d. 1012). His career coincides with a period of great disorder in the Zaidi state in Yemen which was founded in 1597. The realm of the imam was confined to part of the highlands while the lowlands were ruled by the Ottoman Turks. The current imam al-Hadi Ghalib was deposed in 1852 by the population of San'a, who appointed a governor called Ahmad al-Haymi. In the next year 1853, the ulema and notables acknowledged Muhammad as their new imam. As such, he adopted the title al-Mansur Muhammad. He conducted a military campaign to disperse the Arhab tribesmen who had occupied Haima. However, the expedition proved fruitless. Al-Mansur Muhammad himself was expelled from San'a after a very short tenure. When he left the city he cursed the inhabitants. And actually a series of calamities befell the urban population, since cattle and grapes were struck by disease, and the plague ravaged the region in the following year. Al-Mansur Muhammad returned to Wadi'l-Sirr where he continued to pose as imam until 1890, handling disputes among the people which were voluntarily brought forward to him. However, he only wielded local importance, and the political initiative went over to other claimants to the Yemeni imamate, in particular al-Mutawakkil al-Muhsin.

See also

 Imams of Yemen
 History of Yemen

References

Zaydi imams of Yemen
1802 births
1890 deaths
19th-century Arabs
19th-century Yemeni people